Mernda Dragons Rugby League Football Club is an Australian rugby league club based in Mernda, Victoria. The club caters to teams in the junior competition only.

See also

Rugby league in Victoria

References

External links
Mernda Dragons Fox Sports pulse

Rugby league clubs in Melbourne
Rugby league teams in Victoria (Australia)
Rugby clubs established in 2015
2015 establishments in Australia
Sport in the City of Whittlesea